(literally, strong German, albeit with ck for k, as dictated by the conventions of the variant) is an imagined language created by Matthias Koeppel, a German painter and poet and self-proclaimed Sprachkünstler (artist of language). It exaggerates stereotypical (mostly phonetic and orthographic) traits of older stages of German and some modern (especially Upper German) dialects in an impressionistic way, rather than in a rigorously systematic fashion.

Matthias Koeppel started to write humorous poems in "Starckdeutsch" in 1972.

External links 
 Two poems by Matthias Koeppel, with their standard German translations (Internet Archive)
  Preface (standard German) to Matthias Koeppels Starckdeutsch. Eine Auswahl der stärksten Gedichte

German dialects
Constructed languages introduced in the 1970s
Artistic languages